Jenna Bednar is an American political scientist who is Professor of Public Policy at the University of Michigan. In 2019, her book The Robust Federation: Principles of Design was awarded the American Political Science Association Martha Derthick Book Award.

Early life and education 
Bednar was an undergraduate at the University of Michigan. She moved to Stanford University as a doctoral researcher, where she earned a PhD in 1998. Her doctorate investigated the political economy of federal stability. After graduating, she worked at the University of Iowa.

Research and career 
Bender studies the political mechanisms that give rise to stabilities in federal states. She has studied how institutions maintain and distribute authority. Her research showed that the distribution of authority by a constitution can be meaningless if governments do not abide by them. With a focus on the United States, she has examined how the federal government takes advantage of state governments.

In 2009, Bednar published The Robust Federation, Principles of Design, a book which examines how federal constitution can produce resilient governments. The book is mainly theoretical, and was inspired by the writings of the Founding Fathers of the United States. In 2019, The Robust Federation: Principles of Design was awarded the American Political Science Association Martha Derthick Book Award.

Selected publications

References 

Living people
Stanford University alumni
University of Michigan alumni
University of Michigan faculty
American political scientists
American women political scientists
Year of birth missing (living people)
University of Iowa people